was a Japanese football player. He played for Japan national team.

Club career
After graduating from Mikage Higher Normal School, Inoue played for Osaka SC many Japan national team players Kiyoo Kanda, Shiro Azumi, Fukusaburo Harada, Usaburo Hidaka, Toshio Hirabayashi, Setsu Sawagata, Kikuzo Kisaka and Yoshio Fujiwara were playing in those days.

National team career
In May 1923, Inoue was selected Japan national team for 1923 Far Eastern Championship Games in Osaka. At this competition, on May 24, he debuted against Republic of China. But Japan lost the matches (1-5).

National team statistics

References

External links
 
 Japan National Football Team Database

Year of birth missing
Year of death missing
Kobe University alumni
Japanese footballers
Japan international footballers
Association football forwards